Chantal Butzek (born 25 February 1997 in Paderborn) is a German athlete competing in sprinting and hurdling events. She represented her country at the 2016 World Indoor Championships with reaching the semifinals.

Competition record

1Did not start in the final

Personal bests
Outdoor
100 metres – 11.61 (+0.6 m/s, Eskilstuna 2015)
Indoor
60 metres – 7.27 (Dortmund 2016)
60 metres hurdles – 8.42 (Sindelfingen 2014)

References

1997 births
Living people
Sportspeople from Paderborn
German female hurdlers
German female sprinters
21st-century German women